Don't Give Me Names is the second album by the German band Guano Apes, released in 2000. It includes the hit single "Big in Japan" (a cover of the Alphaville song), which peaked at #9 on the German charts and remains one of Guano Apes' most popular songs.

The album was certified gold in Germany and in Switzerland.

Background
After the success of their debut album Proud Like a God, the members of Guano Apes felt pressed to come up with a new album that could hold its own against its predecessor, and spent a lot of time on writing and demoing new songs. According to Dennis Poschwatta in the 2005 documentary Planet of the Apes, the band was determined "not to let anybody trick [them]. The album had to be awesome. It had to be out of sight.”

Recording for Don’t Give Me Names began in October 1999 and was done at three different studios: Horus Studio in Hannover, Vox Klangstudio in Bendestorf, and Galaxy Studios in Mol, Belgium. Wanting to achieve maximum result, the band tried to handle as much tasks as possible themselves, with the working process soon becoming chaotic, costly and time-consuming. Henning Rümenapp related how, eventually, producers Fabio Trentini and Wolfgang Stach were instrumental in “[getting] us all into the groove, bringing four oddballs together and focusing our ideas.”

A number of songs featured on Don't Give Me Names, including “Innocent Greed”, “I Want It” and “Dödel Up”, had already been performed live by the band by the time they were recorded, with a few of them dating back to the period before the release of Proud Like a God. "Big in Japan", the first single, was initially recorded for a compilation album called Pop 2000, released to celebrate 50 years of German pop and rock music. The band originally intended to include “Don't You Turn Your Back on Me” (released as a standalone single in March 1999) on the album as well, but eventually decided against it due to the song's low chart ratings and overall fan feedback.

Four tracks from Don’t Give Me Names were released as singles: “Big in Japan”, ”No Speech", "Living in a Lie" and "Dödel Up".

Track listing

Personnel
 Sandra Nasić – vocals
 Henning Rümenapp – guitars
 Stefan Ude – bass
 Dennis Poschwatta – drums, vocals

Additional musicians

 Marc Steylaerts - violin
 Veronique Gilis - violin
 Marc Tooten - viola
 Hans Vandaele - cello
 Alberto Manzanedo Alvarez - flamenco guitar, palmas (on "Mine All Mine")
 Michael Wolpers - percussion
 Dra Diarra - percussion (on "Dodel Up")
 Dirk Riegner - samples, programming
 Christian Wolff - string arrangements
 Markus Stollenwerk - string conductor

Other staff

 Gert Jacobs – Engineer, Mixing, Mixing Assistant
 Bob Ludwig – Mastering
 Clemens Matznick – Engineer
 Friedel Muders – Artwork, Mastering, Design Coordinator
 Ronald Prent – Mixing
 Dirk Riegner – Programming, Sampling
 Dirk Schelpmeier – Photography
 Wolfgang Stach – Producer, Engineer
 Fabio Trentini – Producer

Charts

Weekly charts

Year-end charts

Certifications

References

External links

2000 albums
Guano Apes albums
GUN Records albums